Karim's Hotel or Karim's is a historic restaurant located near Jama Masjid, Gali Kababian, Old Delhi, Delhi, India. Established in 1913, the restaurant has been described as "synonymous with this area" (Old Delhi) and "arguably the city's most famous culinary destination". Outside Delhi the first restaurant from Karim's came up in Kolkata, with the city now hosting three restaurants of the same. Since April 2021 it's also open in the South Indian city of Bangalore.

History

In mid 19th century, Mohammed Aziz was a cook in the royal court of Mughal Emperor, however after the Bahadur Shah Zafar was exiled, he left the city for Meerut and later Ghaziabad. However, in 1911, when Delhi Durbar was held for the coronation of the King George V, one of Aziz's son Haji Karimuddin moved back to Delhi with an innovative idea of opening a Dhaba with the Mughal culinary, to cater the people coming from all over India to join the coronation. Haji Karimuddin started the Dhaba selling just two items of Alu gosht (mutton with potatoes) and Daal (lentil curry)  served with Rumali Roti.

In 1913, Haji Karimuddin established the Karim Hotel in Gali Kababian, near Jama Masjid, Delhi saying, "I want to earn fame and money by serving the royal food to the common man". The restaurants opened its first branch in 1990s in Nizamuddin West, followed by Kailash Colony, Noida, Gurgaon,  Kamla Nagar, Dwarka, Delhi and in all of the Delhi NCR region.

Today, the fourth generation is running the show with Karim Hotels Pvt. Ltd. at Jama Masjid, a Restaurant called Dastar Khwan-E-Karim at Nizamuddin West New Delhi .

Dining

Main Course
 Shahi Dastar Khwan
 Different Curries of Chicken
Bharatia Pattal
 Kababs
 Pulao & Rice
 Naan & Roti

Dessert
 Kheer Benazir

References

External links 
 

1913 establishments in India
Restaurants established in 1913
Restaurants in Delhi
Tourist attractions in Delhi